Vincent de Vries (born 21 June 1994) is a Dutch male badminton player. He plays in men's single event for the latest. In 2015, he ended to playing badminton and chose to continue his studies in Tilburg University.

Achievements

BWF International Challenge/Series
Men's Singles

Mixed Doubles

 BWF International Challenge tournament
 BWF International Series tournament
 BWF Future Series tournament

References

External links
 Career Overview Vincent DE VRIES
 Vincent de Vries Websites

1994 births
Living people
Dutch male badminton players